The Mazel Identity i1 is a two-seater Spanish sports car concept, which has been produced by Mazel with cooperation and input from the H2R Design firm. It was presented at the 2006 Geneva Motor Show.

It has an aluminium 8-cylinder engine mounted in central position, with rear-wheel drive, and maybe brought into full production in the future.

External links

Mazel
 Identity i1

Sports cars
Cars of Spain
Rear-wheel-drive vehicles
Concept cars
Automobiles with gull-wing doors